Love and War in the Pyrenees is a book written by Rosemary Bailey. Bailey in 2008. The book was awarded the best narrative travel book by the British Guild of Travel Writers.

The book is about  World War II in the Pyrenees region. Rebecca Abrams from The Jewish Chronicle described the book as "a quiet triumph of historical reconstruction."

See also
Sir Henry Russell-Killough

References

British travel books
Pyrenees
2008 non-fiction books
Books about World War II
English non-fiction books